The Church of St John the Divine is a Church of England parish church in Brooklands, Sale, Greater Manchester. The church is a grade II* listed building.

History
The church was built from 1864 to 1868. It was the first Anglican church designed by Alfred Waterhouse, who had previously only worked on secular buildings. It is in the Gothic Revival style and is made of coursed sandstone rubble with a red tiled roof.

In 1897, a stained glass window designed by Morris & Co. was added to the south nave. In 1907, an Arts and Crafts wrought-iron chancel screen designed by Henry Wilson was added.

On 3 October 1974, the church was designated a grade II* listed building.

Present day
The Parish of St. John, Baguley is in the Archdeaconry of Manchester in the Diocese of Manchester. The main Sunday morning service is a Family Communion.

Notable clergy
 Jonathan Draper, later Dean of Exeter, served his curacy here
 Stephen Cherry, later Dean of King's College, Cambridge, served his curacy here.

List of vicars
The parish priest of the Church of St John the Divine also holds the title of Vicar of Brooklands.

 1868–1875: Thomas Brooke 
 1876–1912: Hugh Bethell Jones
 1912–1938: Cyril Bethell Jones 
 1938–1947: J. E. Williams
 1947–1964: Geoffrey Newton Barker
 1964–1979: Ernest Buckley
 1980–1991: Alan Wolstencroft
 1991–1998: John Findon 
 1999–2012: Ian McVeety
 2013–2015: Bryan Hackett
 2017–present: Richard Sherratt

See also

Grade II* listed buildings in Greater Manchester
Listed buildings in Sale, Greater Manchester

References

External links
 Church website
 A Church Near You Entry

Brooklands
Brooklands
Alfred Waterhouse buildings
Brooklands